Caminetti may refer to:

Caminetti v. United States, a 1917 United States Supreme Court case

People with the surname
Farley Drew Caminetti (1886-1945)
Anthony Caminetti (1854-1923)

See also
 Cuminetti (disambiguation)